"Beautiful" is the fifth and final single from American rapper Eminem's sixth studio album Relapse, released on August 11, 2009. The song samples "Reaching Out", originally recorded by British rock band Rock Therapy. This version of "Reaching Out" is taken from the Queen + Paul Rodgers 2005–2006 tour, which used Eminem's "Lose Yourself" as the house music. The song was partially written during the first time he went to rehab in 2005, and the song would not be finished until he got clean years later, when he added a third verse and released the song on Relapse.

Music video 
The video was shot in Detroit and was directed by Anthony Mandler. It premiered on July 2, 2009, on Yahoo! music. The video opens with captions stating that "In 1950, Michigan was 1 of 8 states in America that collectively produced 36% of the world's GNP" and that "Detroit was the greatest manufacturing city in the world." It then cuts to present-day images of the city, featuring Eminem walking through three abandoned structures from that era: Michigan Central Station; the former Packard plant; and Tiger Stadium, including demolition footage of the latter. In each location, he is joined by several people appropriate to each building: an older woman with a suitcase, several autoworkers holding their lunchboxes and tools, and a neighborhood youth baseball team, respectively.

Critical reception 
Rolling Stone called the song a "touching attempt at an inspirational ballad". Pitchfork Media claim that "Relapse hits something of a stride with 'Beautiful. "Beautiful" scored Eminem his ninth straight Top 40 single on the Billboard Hot 100, going back to "Smack That" with Akon. Billboard called the song "epic" and described it as "Part confessional ("I'm just so fucking depressed", begins the track's explicit version) and part "Lose Yourself"-style motivational anthem, "Beautiful" encapsulates the introspective nature of "Relapse" but deviates from the shock tactics that dominate the album", adding that "The song is as much a lighters-in-the-air, arena rock power ballad as it is a lyrical showcase". The song was  nominated at the 52nd Grammy Awards in the Best Rap Solo Performance category, but lost to Jay-Z's "D.O.A. (Death of Auto-Tune)".

Chart performance 
"Beautiful" entered the UK Singles Chart on May 17, 2009, at number 38 and re-entered at #31 due to massive airplay. It was released as the third UK single after "We Made You" and peaked at #12. It became Eminem's 21st Top 40 single in the UK but also his second official single to miss the Top 10. In the U.S., it debuted at #17 on the Billboard Hot 100. The song was on the A-List of the BBC Radio 1 playlist. In the week of July 23, 2009, it re-entered the Hot 100 at #98.

Awards and nominations

Track listing

Personnel 
Credits adapted from Relapse digital booklet.

 Songwriters: M. Mathers, L. Resto, J. Bass, D. Black, A. Hill
 Recorded by: Mike Strange at 54 Sound in Ferndale, Michigan
 Assistant engineers: Tony Campana at 54 Sound in Ferndale, Michigan
 Mixed by: Eminem and Mike Strange at Effigy Studios
 Keyboards by: Jeffrey Bass and Luis Resto
 Bass and guitar by: Jeffrey Bass
 Samples: Contains samples from "Reaching Out" by Queen + Paul Rodgers, written by Don Black and Andy Hill

Charts

Year-end charts

Certifications

References

External links 

2009 singles
Eminem songs
Music videos directed by Anthony Mandler
Songs written by Andy Hill (composer)
Songs written by Eminem
2000s ballads
Contemporary R&B ballads
Song recordings produced by Eminem
Songs about drugs
Shady Records singles
Aftermath Entertainment singles
Songs written by Luis Resto (musician)
2009 songs
Songs written by Jeff Bass